Highway 763 is a highway in the Canadian province of Saskatchewan. It runs from the Bradwell Access Road near Bradwell to the Zelma Access Road near Zelma. Highway 763 is about 26 km (16 mi.) long.

Highway 763 has a 5-km concurrency with Highway 397 just west of Allan, the only town that Highway 763 passes, excluding Bradwell and Zelma.

See also 
Roads in Saskatchewan
Transportation in Saskatchewan

References 

763